Legislative elections were held in Mongolia on 28 June 1992. The result was a victory for the Mongolian People's Revolutionary Party, which won 70 of the 76 seats in the State Great Khural. Voter turnout was 95.6%.

Results

References

Mongolia
1992 in Mongolia
Elections in Mongolia